Luc Deflo (27 February 1958 – 26 November 2018) was a Belgian writer.

Biography
Luc Deflo began his career as a playwright, but upon reading a news article on an American serial killer, he became a novelist. In 1999, he published his first work, Naakte zielen.

The studio  plans on making movies out of his works Naakte zielen and Sluipend gif.

Works
Naakte zielen (1999)
Bevroren hart (2000)
Lokaas (2001)
Kortsluiting (2002)
Sluipend gif (2003)
Onschuldig (2004)
Copycat (2005)
Weerloos (2005)
Hoeren (2006)
Ademloos (2006)
Angst (2007)
Spoorloos (2007)
Pitbull (2008)
Schimmen (2009)
Lust (2009)
Jaloezie (2010)
Prooi (2010)
Enigma (2011)
Enigma (2012)
Losers (2012)
Genadeloos (2013)
Giftige vlinders (2013)
Intifada (2014)
Onderhuids (2014)
Macht (2014)
Teek (2015)

References

External link

1958 births
2018 deaths